Andrew or Andy Harris may refer to:

Sports
 Andy Harris (baseball) (1896–1957), American Negro league baseball player
 Andy Harris (footballer, born 1970), English footballer
 Andrew Harris (cricketer, born 1971), Welsh former cricketer
 Andrew Harris (cricketer, born 1973), English cricketer
 Andy Harris (footballer, born 1977), South African-born footballer in England
 Andrew Harris (Canadian football) (born 1987), Canadian football player
 Andrew Harris (tennis) (born 1994), Australian tennis player

Others
 Andrew L. Harris (1835–1915), American Civil War general and 44th governor of Ohio
 Andy Harris (politician) (born 1957), American physician and politician from Maryland
 Andy Harris (mountain guide) (1964–1996), mountain guide from New Zealand

See also
 Andy Harries (born 1954), British television and film producer